Wahed is a surname or given name, and may refer to:

 Abdul Wahed Al Sayed (born 1977), Egyptian footballer
 Raes Abdul Wahed, Afghan warlord
 Wahed Wafa (born 1952), Afghan singer

See also

 Abdel-Wahed
 Wahid or Waheed, a given name and a surname